Kokkola railway station is located in the town of Kokkola, Central Ostrobothnia, Finland. The railway to Kokkola was completed in 1885 and further to Oulu in 1886. The railway station building is a station built according to the type drawings of the so-called "railway stations of the Oulu railway", designed by Knut Nylander.

The Chydenia Shopping Center is located about 100 meters north of the railway station.

Gallery

See also 
 Jakobstad-Pedersöre railway station
 Oulu railway station

Sources

References

External links 

Railway stations in Central Ostrobothnia
Railway stations opened in 1885
Kokkola